Labia stretching, also referred to as labia elongation or labia pulling, is the act of lengthening the labia minora (the inner lips of the female genitals) through manual manipulation (pulling) or physical equipment (such as weights). It is a familial cultural practice in parts of Eastern and Southern Africa, and a body modification practice elsewhere. It is performed for sexual enhancement for the benefit of both partners, aesthetics, symmetry and gratification.

The labia and the whole vulva differ in size, shape, and colour from one person to another. In that labia stretching is attempting to change this body part to fit an ideal, and that it is often done by older women to girls, it has been compared to female genital mutilation (FGM) and child abuse.

Benefits, drawbacks, and medical issues
Elongated labia are perceived to facilitate orgasm and female ejaculation, and are considered to enhance sexual pleasure for both partners. Women who have unequally long labia may increase the size of the shorter to achieve symmetry. They also swell inwards, partially blocking the entrance to the vagina.

The practice of labia stretching itself does not cause sexually transmitted infections (including HIV). Such infections generally occur later in life through sexual activity. Some writers have asserted that there is a causal link between labia stretching and rates of infection.

One review concluded:

The opposite of labia stretching is labia reduction or labiaplasty, which is performed as a surgical procedure for women whose genitals cause them discomfort or pain, or for aesthetic reasons.

Controversy and legality
Although the World Health Organization previously included labial stretching within the context of "mutilation" (see Genital modification and mutilation), the negative context of that was not supported by the research of Marian Koster MSc and Dr. Lisa Price of Wageningen University, Netherlands. This led the WHO to schedule amending their treatment of it, perhaps as "modification" instead, in February 2008.

The practice of labial stretching does not violate women's rights, in that it does not involve physical violence, unless the woman is misled as to the benefits of the practice. However, it may be contrary to African customary law and rights of women if it is in conflict with public policy.

Girls usually start to stretch their labia from ages 8 to 14, before menarche. Children in the African diaspora practise this too, so it occurs within immigrant communities in, for example, Britain, where a BBC report labelled it a hidden form of child abuse. The girls are subject to familial and social pressure to conform.

Historic context
The early recordings of the results of the practice are perhaps among the Khoisan peoples of southern Africa, where the inner labia were seen to be several centimeters longer than the outer labia. When Captain James Cook reached Cape Town in 1771, towards the end of his first voyage, he acknowledged being  "very desirous to determine the great question among natural historians, whether the women of this country have or have not that fleshy flap or apron which has been called the Sinus pudoris"; eventually a physician described treating patients with labia ranging from half an inch to three or four inches.

In Eastern Africa Monica Wilson recorded the custom through her fieldwork with the Nyakyusa people in the 1930s, and in Southern Africa Isaac Schapera worked with the Nama people, the largest group amongst the Khoikhoi, early in the 20th century, publishing The Khoisan Peoples of South Africa in 1930, in which he documents labia stretching.

Rwanda
In Rwandan culture, female family members teach girls at puberty how to pull their labia to lengthen them (gukuna, "pull", imishino "labia" in Kinyarwanda language), using local medicinal flora to ease the process. Women continue the practice into adulthood and through marriage. The most important aspect of gukuna imishino, which may begin about the age of 10, is to assist the couple to perform the sexual practice of kunyaza, in which the sexual satisfaction of the woman comes before that of the man.

Uganda

Some human rights activists in the country, including feminist scholar Sylvia Tamale, support labia stretching.

Zambia
According to a report in the Global Press Journal, labia stretching is common in Zambia, but such a social taboo that it is rarely discussed. It is defended by traditional marriage counsellors and challenged by feminist activists.

South Pacific
Labia modification is documented as having existed in cultures outside Africa, particularly in the South Pacific. Robert Carl Suggs wrote about it in 1966 regarding the culture of the Marquesas Islands.

Links to other practices
Scholars link labial elongation with genital tattooing. Elsdon Best wrote about the Maori (published in 1924, but apparently referring to a historical custom he had not witnessed himself): "Women were occasionally tattooed on the private parts, and this was a custom among Fijian women. It was alluded to as a tara whakairo." Belgian missionary Gustaaf Hulstaert wrote about genital tattooing in 1938 in Le mariage des Nkundó, about the Mongo people of the Congo:  "Both women and men wear tattoos, but it is more common among women. For women, it is considered more sexual and often located near the sex organs."
Quoted on the overview of the Mongo people by the Database for Indigenous Cultural Evolution at the University of Missouri.</ref> Bronisław Malinowski wrote about the Trobriand Islands in The Sexual Life of Savages in North-Western Melanesia:

See also
Clitoral enlargement methods
Labia piercing
Labia pride
Stretching (body piercing), stretching other parts of the body such as lips and earlobes
Steatopygia, large buttocks
Sarah Baartman, a San woman
Vagina and vulva in art

References

African culture
Female genital procedures
Female genital modification
Marquesan culture
Vulva
Body modification
Female genital mutilation in the United Kingdom
Child abuse